Alcmaeon in Psophis (Alkmaiōn ho dia Psophidos) is a play by Athenian playwright Euripides. The play has been lost except for a few surviving fragments. It was first produced in 438 BCE in a tetralogy that also included the extant Alcestis and the lost Cretan Women and Telephus. The story is believed to have incorporated the death of Argive hero Alcmaeon.

References

Lost plays
Plays by Euripides
Plays based on classical mythology